Forshaw is a surname that may relate to:

Adam Forshaw, English footballer for Leeds United
Christian Forshaw, British musician
Dick Forshaw (1895 – c.1963), British footballer
Jeff Forshaw (born 1968), British professor of particle physics
Joseph Forshaw, Australian ornithologist
Joseph Forshaw (athlete) (1881–1964)
Michael Forshaw (born 1952), Australian Senator
Mike Forshaw (born 1970), British rugby league coach
Thelma Forshaw (1923–1995), Australian writer
William Thomas Forshaw (1890–1943), English soldier